The 1960 North Dakota State Bison football team was an American football team that represented North Dakota State University during the 1960 NCAA College Division football season as a member of the North Central Conference. In their fourth year under head coach Bob Danielson, the team compiled a 3–5–1 record.

Schedule

References

North Dakota State
North Dakota State Bison football seasons
North Dakota State Bison football